Hello, Hank Jones is an album by saxophonist Clifford Jordan which was recorded direct-to-disc in New York City in 1977 and released on the Japanese Eastworld label.

Reception

In his review on Allmusic, Ken Dryden stated "Jordan, who is the leader of the session, shines on tenor sax, driven by an outstanding rhythm section... Any jazz fan fortunate enough to locate a copy decades later will enjoy the performances and marvel at the warm, very intimate sound achieved by the musicians and the engineers on that summer day in 1978"

Track listing 
All compositions by Clifford Jordan except as indicated
 "Vienna" - 16:19  
 "Bohemia After Dark" (Oscar Pettiford) - 7:29  
 "Love for Sale" (Cole Porter) - 8:02

Personnel 
Clifford Jordan - tenor saxophone
Hank Jones - piano
Reggie Workman - bass
Freddie Waits - drums

References 

Clifford Jordan albums
1978 albums